Kunya's bent-toed gecko (Cyrtodactylus kunyai) is a species of lizard in the family Gekkonidae. The species is endemic to Thailand.

Etymology
The specific name, kunyai, is in honor of Thai herpetologist Kirati Kunya.

Geographic range
C. kunyai is found in northeastern Thailand, in Loei Province.

Habitat
The preferred natural habitat of C. kunyai is dry caves.

Description

Reproduction
The mode of reproduction of C. kunyai is unknown.

References

Further reading
Pauwels OSG, Sumontha M, Keeratikiat K, Phanamphon E (2014). "Cyrtodactylus kunyai (Squamata: Gekkonidae), a new cave-dwelling Bent-toed Gecko from Loei Province, northeastern Thailand". Zootaxa 3821 (2): 253–264. (Cyrtodactylus kunyai, new species).

Cyrtodactylus
Reptiles described in 2014